Sunshine Dream is the third double-album compilation of the Beach Boys' music to be compiled by their former label, Capitol Records (following the earlier Endless Summer and Spirit of America). Released in 1982, the album features singles and album tracks ranging from 1964 to 1969, and it is the first time "The Beach Boys Medley" appears on an album; it reached number 12 in 1981 as a single. The album was compiled and released while the Beach Boys were contracted with CBS Records. 
Due to the appearance of more recent compilations, Sunshine Dream has long since been out of print.

Track listing
All songs by Brian Wilson and Mike Love, except where noted.

Singles
"The Beach Boys Medley" b/w "God Only Knows" (Capitol A-5030), October 1981 US number 12

Sunshine Dream (Capitol SVBB 12220) hit number 180 in the US.

References

1982 greatest hits albums
The Beach Boys compilation albums
Capitol Records compilation albums